Bruce Obomeyoma Onobrakpeya (born 30 August 1932) is a Nigerian printmaker, painter and sculptor. He has exhibited at the Tate Modern in London, the National Museum of African Art of the Smithsonian Institution in Washington, D.C. and the Malmö Konsthall in Malmö, Sweden.
The National Gallery of Modern Art, Lagos has an exhibit of colourful abstract canvases by Onobrakpeya
and his works can be found at the Virtual Museum of Modern Nigerian Art, although no exhibitions were showing .

Early years
Bruce Onobrakpeya was born in Agbarha-Otor in Delta State, son of an Urhobo carver. He was raised as a Christian, but also learned the traditional beliefs. His family moved to Benin City, Edo State, when he was a child. He attended Western Boys High School, where he was taught art by Edward Ivehivboje, among other subjects.
He also attended drawing classes at the British Council Art Club in Benin City. 
Onobrakpeya was inspired by the watercolour paintings of Emmanuel Erabor. After leaving high school, Onobrakpeya was hired as an art teacher at the Western Boys High School (1953–56).
In 1956 he left for Ondo, where he taught at the Ondo Boys High School for a year.

Formal art education

In October 1957 Onobrakpeya was admitted to the Nigerian College of Arts, Science and Technology, now the Ahmadu Bello University, Zaria. Funded by a Federal Government Scholarship, he was trained in the Western tradition of representational art. At the same time, he began to experiment with forms in relation to Nigerian folklore, myths and legends. Much of his work uses stylistic elements and compositions derived from traditional African sculpture and decorative arts.

The Zaria Arts Society, later called the Zaria Rebels, was formed on 9 October 1958 by a group of art students at the college led by Uche Okeke with the aim of "decolonizing" the visual arts as taught by expatriate Europeans. Onobrakpeya has said that the college gave him technical skills but the Zaria Arts Society, a discussion group, shaped his perspectives as a professional artist. The society gave him the confidence to seek a personal expressive idiom. He elongated his figures, ignored perspective and evoked the supernatural through ambiguous decorations.

Later career

Onobrakpeya later attended a series of printmaking workshops in Ibadan, Oshogbo, Ife and Haystack Mountain School of Crafts, Maine, US. 
His first one-man exhibition was held in 1959 in Ughelli in the Niger Delta.
Later he exhibited in the US, Italy, Zimbabwe, Germany, Britain, Kenya and elsewhere.
Onobrakpeya was an important force in the renaissance in contemporary art in Nigeria.
For many years he taught at St. Gregory's College, Lagos.

Onobrakpeya created the Bruce Onobrakpeya Foundation, of which he is President, and which organises the annual Harmattan workshop in his home town of Agbara Otor, Delta State.
The foundation is an artist-led Non-Governmental Organization formed in 1999. 
It aims to encourage the growth of art and culture by giving artists opportunities to gain skills, while increasing public awareness of African art and its benefits to society.
The foundation organised the Amos Tutuola Show, Lagos (2000).
It has participated in many other shows.

Recognition

"Bruce Onobrakpeya is amongst the most successful artists to have emerged in West Africa during the 20th century, with continuing and commanding influence on the generation of artists in Nigeria, who have come to maturity in the post colonial period."

 Honorary D. Litt. from the University of Ibadan in 1989.
 Honourable mention at the Venice Biennale.
 Fellowship of the Society of Nigerian Artists on 6 June 2000.  
 Pope John Paul II award for painting the life of Saint Paul, 
 Fellowship of Asele Institute award, 
 Sadam Hussein award, 
 Solidra Circle award, and Fulbright Exchange Scholar award.
 Onobrakpeya is the recipient of the Living Human Treasure Award (2006) given by UNESCO,
 Second winner of Nigeria's prestigious Nigerian Creativity Award by the Federal Government of Nigeria on 14 September 2010. Its first winner was Chinua Achebe.
 Honorary Degree of Doctor of Arts (Hon. D. A) from the Delta State University, 2017
 Recipient of (NNOM) Nigerian National Order of Merit, 2017, the apex and the most important award for scholastic excellence in Nigeria

Onobrakpeya's work

Art periods

A definitive work on the art of Bruce Onobrakpeya would have to be an intense exercise.  Each of these segments represents specific periods in the artist's studio practice, which spans a period of over 50 years.

The first segment is the Mythical Realism (1957–62), which represents paintings, and lino cut prints that depict folklore themes, and Northern landscapes (Zaria). This is the period of his early development as an' artist, which coincided with Nigeria's Independence. The idea of projecting the African personality was of major importance to the artists of this period. It was also at this time that the Zaria Arts Society, the forerunner of the Society of Nigerian Artists (SNA), was formed and accompanied by the propagation of the concept of "natural synthesis". Works in this category include the paintings: Awhaire & the Bird, Hunters Secret, and A Tree in Northern Landscape, and the Lino Cut Prints Zaria Indigo, Two Faces, Boli Woman and Awakening (Negritude)

The second segment focuses on the artist's workshop experiments and his Bronzed lino relief series otherwise known as the Sunshine Period (1962–1967). This is the period when he started to attend various workshops. Some of the popular works of this period include Leopard in a Cornfield (Iino print), Scarecrow (silkscreen) and Man & Two Wives (silkscreen)

The Mask and the Cross (1967–78) series represents the period when the artist executed several Christian themes commissioned by the Church such as Nativity II (Iino engraving), The Last Days of Christ (plastocast), Obara Ishoshi (bronzed Iino relief) and Pope John Paul (metal foil), as well as the Plastography Period, a time when the artist developed a lot of ideas he started in Zaria in the late 1950s and early 1960s such as Travellers II, Songs of Life, and Rain & Cry at Otorogba.

The fourth segment represents the historical vignettes. These are pictures known as the Symbols of Ancestral Groves (1978–84) They depict historical figures, mostly royalty from the Benin Kingdom such as Oba Aka. Other works in this period include Eghrighri and Ibiebe and the tortoise and enemu

The Sahelian Masquerades (1984–88) were pieces created to highlight the destruction of the environment These works focused on the cultures of the Sahelian regions Works in this period are also loaded with a lot of political undertones such as Horns Of Freedom, and Edjo Aton (principles of good governance), which draws a lot of attention to role of government in relation to the issues of desertification.

The Mask Series (1990–1995) represent the development of images, which inspired depictions of masks treated in different print media that bring out the philosophies of the people. They also address' the subject of change. Images I and /I as well as A Panel of 15 represent this period.

Social Unrest (1995–99) is the period of strife within the society. This is represented by large paintings, which are prayers for divine help against military dictatorship and political instability. Here we have drawings and pictures, which focus on the murder of Ken Saro Wiwa. On the front burner,
are the ecological and socio-economic problems. In this segment you have works such as Ekugbe (Unity), Nude & Protest and Smoke from the Broken Pipe.

Finally we enter the Installations Period (1995 – Date), which is the period the artist embarked on installations as an art form. These works are characterised by the arrangement of different discarded materials to create works of art. These installations were essentially to draw attention to importance of protecting our environment. Works in this category include Animals of Eve, Adjene, New City III and Voices of silenced Voices.

Innovations

Since 1966, as an experimental artist, Onobrakpeya has discovered, innovated and perfected several techniques both in printmaking and relief sculpture that are uniquely Nigerian. Generally, printmaking is a fine art process of producing pictures from a plate which the artist has previously created.  Having conceived the idea, the artist then creates an image or images on a plate through any of the printmaking techniques.  The images are then transferred onto a paper or any other surface by printing or embossing method.  The advantage is that the artist can use one of such plates to produce as many copies of the artwork as required, sometimes giving them various colours. Onobrakpeya has increased the techniques tremendously.

Bronzed lino Relief is a collage of used lino blocks with bronze colour patina. Onobrakpeya developed this relief technique in 1966 as a way of preserving used blocks which in themselves possess sculptural qualities.

Plastocast Relief is a painted low-relief design that was cast with resin.  The idea started as an extension of the bronzed lino relief.  The used plastograph plates (like used lino blocks) have sculptural low relief effects which make them unique as art works.  An attempt to retain the original used plates, and at the same time give collectors a chance to possesses and share the beauty of the original, led Onobrakpeya to develop a method of creating other original plates from existing used plates through the use of plaster of Paris.  Sometimes, small plates with the same or similar themes are arranged together and cast to form a larger picture.  A further development in plastocast relief is carving directly on abandoned or congealed plaster of Paris then applying resin on the cast and pulling out a positive. However, for a deep engraving on plaster of Paris to produce bold relief, depends on the nature of the plaster of Paris.  This is known as plastocast plate.  It is painted or tinted plastocast plate that becomes a plastocast relief.

Plastograph is a term given by Onobrakpeya to describe his deep etching technique that he innovated in 1967 through what he referred to as the Hydrochloric Acid Accident.  It is an engraving on a low relief surface made of zinc or similar surface material and printed in the intaglio style.

Additive Plastograph is another technique that involves making of print images on a sheet of sand paper, using glue as a drawing medium.  This is glued to the sand paper using intensive solar heat.  Ink is then applied to the resultant images by the intaglio inking process.  any link in excess is wiped off with a dry cloth.  This is later taken to the press to register the relief already created by the glue on a soaked and semi-dried cartridge printing paper.  Finally, the registered impressions are painted, using pastel oil to achieve the desired forms by the artist.

Metal Foil Deep Etching is a plastograph print in which aluminium foil is used to draw the engraved images.  The thin foil is cut and placed on an engraved plate and then the embossed sheet is removed, turned over and filled with resin to stabilise the relief.   The resin filled foil is then laminated on plywood or no any other surface.  Onobrakpeya first started experimenting with foils and from the experiments transformed the foils into a print medium in the 1980s.  He used already printed plates to try out the technique.
 
Metal Foil Relief Print is a three-dimensional metal foil print drawn on a plastocast plate.  A fairly thick foil is cut and placed over a plate and hand pressed to transfer the shape of the picture on the plate.  The foil is then removed and filled from behind.  It is then laminated onto a plywood and coloured in the same way as the metal foil deep etching print process already discussed above.  Note that while the metal foil deep etching print is drawn from plastograph plates, the metal foil relief print is hand embossed on a plastograph plate.

Ivorex is a new technique recently developed by Onobrakpeya which simulates optical effect of old ivory engraving on bone or elephant tusk.  The material used, however, is polymer.

Ibiebe alphabets and ideograms

Ibiebe is a writing style developed by Onobrakpeya. It features his invented script of ideographic geometric and curvilinear glyphs. The designs reflect the artist's knowledge of his Urhobo heritage, rich in symbols and the proverbs they elicit, as well as his appreciation of Chinese, Japanese, Ghanaian and Nigerian calligraphy. Onobrakpeya invented and refined this script called Ibiebe from 1978 to 1986, when he revisited in his art, ideas linked with traditional religion, customs and history. Ibiebe glyphs aim at encapsulating universal concepts of timeless values. The artist clearly delights in the script's forms and visual qualities as well as its power to communicate. These ibiebe ideograms which are often abstract, also lend themselves to calligraphic, painterly and sculptural presentation.

Selected exhibitions 

1959: First one-man exhibition, Ughelli, Delta State, Nigeria.
1960: Group show of contemporary Nigerian art in the Independence Exhibition, Lagos.
1962: Art From Africa, Phelps Stokes Fund, New York.
1965: Commonwealth Exhibition of Art, Cardiff and London.
1967: Biennale of Illustrations, Bratislava.
1967: Group show of nine Nigerian artists. Show toured London, Moscow and Warsaw.
1969: International Book Fair, Bologna
1970: St. Andrew’s School, Middletown, Delaware, Howard University, Washington, D.C.
1971: Commonwealth Art Gallery, London.
1972: Gallery, Watatu, Nairobi. Newark State College, Newark, New Jersey.
 Art Society of the International Monetary Fund, Washington, D.C.
1973: Afro Centrum Gallery, Berlin.African Heritage Gallery, Nairobi.
February 1974: Contemporary African, National Museum of African Art, Washington, D.C. Exhibition of contemporary developments in art of Africa. Exhibited alongside Ibrahim El Salahi, Skunder Boghossian, Twins Seven Seven, Valente Malangatana and others
1974: Contemporary African Festival, Field Museum of Natural History, Chicago, and Museum of Natural History, New York.
1975: Martin Luther King, Jr. Library, Washington, D.C. Sponsored by African-American Women’s Association.
1976: Gallery of Litterio Calapai, Glencoe, Illinois.
1977: The Best of Africa, Toronto. Saint Paul in Contemporary Art, Vatican Museum, Rome.
1978: Tenth one-man exhibition at the Goethe Institute, Lagos.
1979: One-man exhibition of prints in Amersfoort, the Netherlands. The show was arranged by Mrs. DeVries and sponsorship was by DHV of Lagos and Amersfoort. It was opened by Professor Ru Van Rossem of Tilburg University.
1980: One-man exhibition of prints (with emphasis on printing on metal foil) at the Best of Africa Gallery, Toronto, Canada.
1980: One-man exhibition in Glatt Centrum, Zurich, Switzerland. It was sponsored by CIBA-GEIGY and SGS.
1981–82: One-man exhibition of prints and paintings arranged by Galarie Glahe and opened by Nigerian Ambassador to Germany H.E. Mohammed Lawal Rafindadi, in Bonn, Germany.
1983: One-man exhibition of prints and painting titled Sabbatical Experiments 1978–1983, co-sponsored by Goethe Institute (German Cultural Institute) NIJ House, Victoria Island, Lagos, and the Society of Nigerian Artists (Lagos State Branch). The guest of honour at the opening was Susanne Wenger from Oshogbo.
1984: One-man exhibition titled Bruce Onobrakpeya: 25 Years of Creative Search, at the Foyer and Courtyard of the Institute of African Studies, University of Ibadan.
1984: One-man show of plastograph, prints and plastocast relief paintings to mark the Netherlands/Belgium Week at Goethe Institute, Victoria Island, Lagos.
1988: Exhibition of Sahelian Masquerades, Italian Cultural Institute, Lagos
1989: The Sahelian Masquerade was shown in: Kew Garden London, Greenwich Citizen Gallery near London, and Pacific Lutheran University, Tacoma, Washington State.
1990: Participation in group show African Contemporary Art – Changing Traditions, organised by studio Museum, Harlem, New York. Participated in the 44th Venice Biennale.
1990: Riegelsberger Gallery Mannheim, Germany. A show of recent art works sponsored by ABB (Asea Brown Boveri).
1990: Unity Through Arts, National Museum Onikan, Lagos sponsored by Guinness (Nigeria) Limited.
1991: Sahelian Masquerade, exhibition in National Gallery of Zimbabwe, Gibbes Museum of Art Charleston, South Carolina, USA, College of Charleston, South Carolina, USA, African American Gallery Charleston, South Carolinas, USA
1992: Bruce Onobrakpeya: A Retrospective. One of the events organised by Society of Nigerian Artists to mark the artist’s 60th birthday at the National Museum, Onikan, Lagos.
1993: The Spirit in Ascent accompanied with a 270-page monograph, a press conference and a symposium were sponsored by The Shell Petroleum Development Company of Nigeria Limited and launched by Chief Philip Asiodu, Hon. Secretary of Petroleum and National Resources at the NIIA Victoria Island, Lagos. The Society of Nigerian Artists was a co-organizer of the events.
1994: Inaugural Group Show at the Pushkin Art and Antique Gallery Victoria Island, Lagos
1995: Seven Stories About Modern Art in Africa – Whitechapel Art Gallery, London. One of the events of Britain’s global showcase Africa '95.
1996: Seven Stories About Modern Art in Africa – Malmo Konsthall, Malmo, Sweden. Ivorex Engravings including the Shrine II entered for the Seven Stories About Modern Art exhibited in London and Malmo.
1996: Onobrakpeya at Singletary Gallery & African Art Museum; Portsmouth, Virginia, USA. The exhibition opening was accompanied by the presentation of a paper by Onobrakpeya's son titled "Footprints of the Tiger"
1998: Wise Art Gallery, Norfolk State University, USA 
1998: "Ovuomaroro" at Elizabeth City State University, North Carolina, USA 
1998: Christine Gerlach Show, German Community, Abuja, Nigeria.
1999: Exhibition of prints and paintings Alliance Francaise, Ikoyi, Lagos. Promoter of Nigerian Art-Goethe Institute, Victoria Island, Lagos. Christine Gerlach Show, German Community, Abuja, Nigeria.
1999: Amos Tutuola Show – Folklore-inspired art in honour of the novelist – Aina Onabolu House, National Gallery of Art, National Theatre, Iganmu, Lagos.
2000: Exhibition of paintings, prints sculptures, installations etc. by Otu-Ewena Artists, Aina Onabolu, Building National Theatre Complex, Iganmu, Lagos. 
2000: Onobrakpeya at the Armstrong/Slater Gallery, Virginia, USA
2001: Century City: Art and Culture in the Modern Metropolis – Tate Modern Gallery London.
2001: Bruce Onobrakpeya at Singletary Gallery & African Art Museum; Portsmouth, Virginia, USA
2001: Two Identities: Printmakers Bruce Onobrakpeya and Mitzi Humphrey at Visual Arts Center, TCC at Olde Towne, Portsmouth, Virginia.
2002: Exhibition of paintings, sculpture, mixed-media prints, ceramics and installations by Otu-Ewena Artists International, Aina Onabolu, Building National Theatre Complex, Iganmu. Exhibition was in honour of Onobrakpeya at 70.
2002: Bruce Onobrakpeya: Window Into his Art: Retrospective Exhibition of selected works from various periods of his artistic career spanning 1957 to date, held at the National Gallery of Art, Aina Onabolu Building, National Theatre Complex, Iganmu, Lagos 
2002: Exhibition: Rhythms of the Forge: A presentation of the fourth Harmattan Workshop Series (Agbarha Otor), at the French Cultural Center, Kingsway Road, Ikoyi, Lagos. The presentation comprised lectures demonstrations, seminar and exhibition of artworks selected from the Four Harmattan Workshops so far held i.e. 1998, 1999, 2000 and 2002.
2002: Jewels of the Crucible. This exhibition presented works produced at the 4th Harmattan Workshop, showcasing recent developments in jewellery bronze casting, wood carving and several other media. Works of the Otu Ewena Artists International were also shown at the Nimbus art Center, Maitama Sule Street, Ikoyi Lagos.
2002: Participated in Rhythms of Fulfilment, exhibition organised by Akwa Ibom Chapter of the Society of Nigerian Artists. Exhibition was in honour of Onobrakpeya at 70 and was opened by Governor Victor Obong Attah of Akwa Ibom State and featured the works of over 30 artists.
2002: Ways of the Rivers: Arts and Environment of the Niger Delta: Showed installation Akporode at UCLA Fowler Museum of Cultural History. Exhibition expected to tour various cities in the US.
2003: Celebrate Exhibition: Abuja, Nigeria: As major contributor to the CHOGM (Commonwealth Heads of Government Meeting) Exhibition organised by lead artist Chinwe Chukwuogo-Roy MBE and John Sheeran. 
2004: Onobrakpeya at Singletary Gallery & African Art Museum; Portsmouth, Virginia, USA 
2004: The Harvest of the Harmattan Retreat. Exhibition organised in collaboration with the Pan African University, Lagos. 
2004–06: Where Gods and Mortals Meet: Continuity and Renewal in Urhobo Art, New York, Columbia, S.C. and Washington D.C., USA 
May 2004: Art and Democracy, a group exhibition mounted during 5th anniversary of Democracy in Nigeria; held at Nelrose Hotel, Asaba, Delta State.
2006: Jewels of Nomadic Images, held at Quintessence Gallery, Falomo, Ikoyi, Lagos.
2008: Auction / Exhibition organised by Arthouse Contemporary Limited, at Civic Centre, Victoria Island, Lagos.
2008: October Rain. Society of Nigerian Artists (S.N.A) group exhibition – Held at the National Museum, Onikan, Lagos.
2008: Auction / Exhibition organised by Arthouse Contemporary Limited, at Civic Centre,Victoria Island, Lagos.
2008: Art Expo, organised by Art Gallery Association of Nigeria (AGAN) in conjunction with National Gallery of Art (NGA), held at the National Museum, Onikan, Lagos.
March 2010: Africa Now. Auction/ Exhibition at Bonhams, Manhattan, New York CityA.
2010 Retrospective exhibition of Bruce Onobrakpeya titled The Legacy at the Grillo Pavilion in Ikorodu, Lagos Nigeria.
2010: 'Evolving Currents", exhibition in celebration of 50 years of Nigerian visual arts in honour of 50 years of Independence. Exhibition was organised by Iroko Art, Abuja, Nigeria.
November 2011: "Beyond Imagination" An Exhibition of Artworks by Nigerian Masters (artists exhibited include Ben Enwonwu, Twins Seven Seven, Muraino Oyelami, Erhabor Emokpai, Bruce Onobrakpeya and others), at the Thought Pyramid Exhibition Center, Abuja, Nigeria.

Body of work

Public collections holding his work

 University of Lagos Library, Akoka, Lagos
 Catholic Chapel, University of Ife, Ile-Ife
 St. Paul’s Church, Ebute-Metta, Lagos
 National Gallery of Modern Art, National Theatre, Iganmu, Lagos
 St. John the Evangelist Church, Shogunle, Ikeja
 Museum of African and African-American Art and Antiquities, Buffalo, New York
 Eda Lord Demarest Memorial African Art Collection, University of Redlands
 University of Alberta, Edmonton, Alberta, Canada
 Vatican Museum, Rome
 National Museum of African Art, Smithsonian Institution, in Washington, D.C
 Hvittrask Suomi – Finland (Eliel Saarinen’s Studio Home and Exhibition)
 Murtala Mohammed International Airport, Ikeja
 Leader of Victory Museum, Baghdad, Iraq
 Presidential Villa, Aso Rock, Abuja, Nigeria
 National Gallery, Nairobi, Kenya
 Victoria and Albert Museum London. 
 The Metropolitan Museum of Art,
 Minneapolis Institute of Arts 
 The British Museum.
 King Mohammed VI Collection Morocco.
 Tate Modern, London.

Book illustrations

 Achebe, Chinua, No Longer At Ease, Heinemann, London
 Babalola, Adeboye, Iwe Ede Yoruba, Apa Kini, Longmans of Nigeria, 1961
 Ekwensi, Cyprian, An African Night’s Entertainment, AUP Lagos, 1962
 Ekwensi, Cyprian, Juju Rock, AUP Lagos
 Nigerian Episcopal Conference, May Your Kingdom Come, Geoffery Chamman, London, 1969
 Nwankwo, Nkem, Tales Out of School, (Cover illustration), AUP, Ibadan
 Onadipe, Kola, Sugar Girl, AUP, 1964
 Uwemedimo, Rosemary, Akpan and the Smugglers, AUP, Ibadan, 1965
 Quacoopne, T. N. O., West African Religion, AUP,Ibadan, 1969
 Taiwo, Oladele, The Hunter And The Hen, AUP, Ibadan, 1969
 Haeger, Barbara, Africa: On Her Schedule is Written A Change, AUP, Ibadan, 1981
 Onadipe, Kola, Magic Land of the Shadows, AUP, Lagos, 1970
 Soyinka and Fagunwa, A Forest of a Thousand Demons, Nelson, London
 Deliss, Clementine, Seven Stories About Modern Art in Africa, White Chapel Art Gallery, London, 1985
 Nzekwu, Onuora and Michael Crowder, Eze Goes to School (cover Illustration), AUP, Ibadan, 1986
 Fagunwa, Daniel Orowole, Forest of A Thousand Daemons, City Lights, 2013

Dissertations and selected reference materials

AIPOH, MARY ANNE U., "Religious Themes in Bruce Onobrakpeya’s Works". An unpublished dissertation presented to the Department of Fine Arts, Faculty of Arts, University of Ife, Ile-Ife, Nigeria, as part of the fulfilment for the Degree B.A. (Fine Arts) 1983, 53 pages.
EKEH, PETER P., "Studies in Urhobo Culture. Chapter 26: Bruce Onobrakpeya: His Art and International Reputation", by Richard A. Singletary, Ph.D. of Singletary Gallery & African Art Museum, Portsmouth, Virginia, USA, pp. 632–681. Urhobo Historical Society (Buffalo, New York and Ikeja, Lagos Nigeria) , 768 pages with index and photo of Onobrakpeya.
FULLANI, GIOVANNI (E), San Paolo Nell” Art Contemporanea (Musei Vaticani (1977) page 112,176
FALUADE, GBOLAHAN, "The Art of Bruce Onobrakpeya" (unpublished essay submitted to the Department of Fine Arts in partial fulfilment for the award of B.A. (Fine Art), University of Ife, Ile-Ife, Nigeria, June 1979), 59 pages.
FOSU, KOJO, 20th Century Art of Africa, Zaira, Nigeria: Gaskiya Corporation Ltd, 1986.
JEGEDE, DELE, "Trends in Contemporary Nigerian Art, A Historical Analysis", unpublished Ph.D. dissertation, Indiana University Press Bloomington and London 1973.
MOUNT, MARSHAL WARD, African Art: The Year Since 1920, Indiana University Press, Bloominghton and London, 1973.
ODUFEJO, C. M. SUNDAY, "The Art of Bruce Onobrakpeya as I See it in 1975" (unpublished HND thesis, Yaba College of Technology), June 1976 88 pages.
OKEKE EZE, EMMANUEL, "Bruce Onobrakpeya – A Research into the Print Experiments of a Contemporary Nigerian Artist" (unpublished Bachelor of Arts thesis, University of Nigeria, Nsukka), 1976, 92 pages.
OKEKE, UCHE, Art in Development – A Nigerian Perspective, Documentation Centre, Asele Institute Nimo, Nigeria and African American Cultural Centre, Minneapolis, USA, 1982, 91 pages.
UDOMA EKPO UDO "Non-Naturalistic Representation in Contemporary Nigerian Paintings (A Study of Styles and Trends)", an unpublished Master of Arts dissertation, Ahmadu Bello University, Zaria, 1989.
OLAOSEBIKAN W. A., Cultural and Creative Arts: A Source Book for Teachers, Ibadan: Evans Brothers (Nigeria Publishers) Ltd, Ibadan, page 38, 60, 112, 116.
OYELOLA, PAT Everyman’s Guide to Nigerian Art, Nigeria. Magazine special publication, Lagos, 1976
Nigerian Artistry: Written by Pat Oyelola with foreword by Bruce Onobrakpeya, published by Mosuro Publishers, 2010.
SPRING, CHRISTOPHER ANGANZA AFRIKA, African Art Now, Lawrence King, 2008, pp. 246–251.
SIKPI, GREGORY KOFI, "History of Contemporary Nigerian Art" (unpublished Bachelor of Arts Degree thesis, Faculty of Arts, University of Lagos, July 1988)
WAHLMAN, MAUDE, Contemporary African Art, Chicago, 1974
ROLF BROCKMANN, GERD HOTTER, Szene Lago, Reise in Eine Afrikanische, Kultermetropole, Trickster Verlag 1994.
WALKER, JAMES The Black Experience in Canada, published by the Ontario Education Communications Authority, 1979, page 80.
WILLET, FRANK, African Art, Thames and Hudson London, 1971.
VERNICEM. KELLY, Nigerian Artist: A Who’s Who and Bibliography, 
Published JANET L., STANLEY for the National Museum of African Art Branch Smithsonian Institution Libraries Washington, D.C. by Hans Zell London, 1993.
STANLEY, JANET L., Arts of Africa – An Annotated Bibliography. Volume I & II African Studies Association Press, Atlanta, 1992, 1993
KENNEDY, JEAN, New Currents, Ancient Rivers: Contemporary African Artists in a Generation of Change, Smithsonian Institution Press, Washington D.C. USA1992.
HANS D’ ORVILLE, Leadership for Africa, edited, 1995 (Editor)
DUNCAN,. CLARKE, African Art, Random House, New York.
PICTON, JOHN, Image and Form (prints drawings and Sculpture from Southern Africa and Nigeria) School of African and Oriental Studies (SOAS) University of London 1997.
REVUE NOIRE Nigeria: African Contemporary Art, No. 30,1998. (Jean Loup Pivin) Editorial
JAMES SHOAF TURNER, The Dictionary of Art, Macmillan Publishers Limited, 1996 (Editor).
PAUL CHIKE DIKE & PAT OYELOLA	The Zaria Art Society: A New Consciousness. National Gallery of Art. 1998.
NZEGWU NKIRU Contemporary Textures, Multidimensionality in Nigerian Art ISSA 1999.
CATHERINE KING, Views of Difference: Different Views of Art, Yale University Press, New Haven & London in association with The Open University 1999.
SIDNEY LITTLEFIELD KASFIR, Contemporary African Art – Thames & Hudson, London & New York 1999.
ISHOLA-LEMOMU, KUNLE, Bruce Onobrakpeya 1990–2000. Unpublished dissertation for the award of the Bachelor of Arts Degree, Lagoke Akintola University, Ogbomosho 2001
PAMELA MC. CLUSKY and ROBERT FARIS THOMPSON, Art from Africa-Long Steps Never Broke a Back, Seattle Art Museum and Princeton University
Press 2002.
MARTHA G. ANDERSON And PHILIP M. PEEK, Ways of the Rivers: Arts and Environment of the Niger Delta. UCLA Fowler Museum of Natural History, Los Angeles 2002.
Richard Singletary Bruce Onobrakpeya, USA, 2002
BARBARA PLANKENSTEINER, Benin Kings and Rituals (Court Arts from Nigeria), 2007.
JEWELS OF NOMADIC IMAGES, with essays by Peju Laiwola, Ekpo Udo Udoma and Olu Amoda, published by Ovuomaroro 2009
JOHN GODWIN AND GILLIAN HOPWOOD, The Architecture of Demas Nwoko, Farafina, Lagos. 2009.
MASKS OF FLAMING ARROWS, Edited by Dele Jegede, with essays by  David Opkako and Gani Odutokun, 5 Continents, Italy, 2013.
DOZIE IGWEZE, The Story Teller of Agbarha-Otor, Bruce Onobrakpeya’s Visual Tales. Hourglass Gallery, 2016.

Films and documentaries

Kindreds Spirits: Contemporary Nigerian Artists, Smithsonian World Washington, D.C. USA
The Magic of Nigeria. Produced by Delka/Polystar directed by Ola Balogun, Lagos, Nigeria.
Recalling the Future Art by Joanna Grabski, Produced and directed by Claudine Pommier Executive Producer Cheikh Tidiane N'diaye./Arts in Action Society (Vancouver, Canada) 2002.
The Harmattan Workshop Experience: The Journey so far: film and documentary on 10 years the Agbarha- Otor Harmattan workshop Experience produced and directed by Onobrakpeya, 2009.
RedHot: Produced by Communication for Change, directed by Sandra Obiago, June 2011, Lagos, Nigeria.

References

Nigerian artists
Urhobo people
1932 births
Living people
Elizabeth City State University faculty
Nigerian schoolteachers
Members of the Order of the Niger
Nigerian printmakers
20th-century Nigerian painters
21st-century Nigerian painters
Ahmadu Bello University alumni
Recipients of the Nigerian National Order of Merit Award